This is a list of former personnel from the professional wrestling promotion Lucha Underground.

Notes

References

alumni
Lucha Underground alumni